is a Japanese manga artist. She is best known for writing Seito Shokun! (Attention Students!), for which she won the Kodansha Manga Award for shōjo in 1978.

References

External links 
 
 Profile at The Ultimate Manga Guide

Winner of Kodansha Manga Award (Shōjo)
Living people
Manga artists from Chiba Prefecture
People from Mobara
1950 births